Carroll Transit System (CTS) is the primary provider of mass transportation in Carroll County, Maryland. The agency operates 6 bus routes from Monday through Friday and once ran an additional route on Saturdays. Approximately 600 people use the service each day. The Saturday route was discontinued in October 2022 due to low ridership.

Route list
Westminster (Purple)
Westminster (Black)
Taneytown (Green)
South Carroll (Red)
Eldersburg (Blue)
North Carroll (Orange)
Westminster Saturday

References

External links
Carroll Transit System

Bus transportation in Maryland
Transportation in Carroll County, Maryland